Vrban or Vërban could refer to the following settlements:

Vrban (Central Serbia) - a village near Bujanovac
Vërban - Village in Kosovo also known as Vrban